Şəkili or Shekili may refer to:
 Şəkili, Agdash, Azerbaijan
 Şəkili, Goychay, Azerbaijan